The 1950–51 IHL season was the sixth season of the International Hockey League, a North American minor professional league. Six teams participated in the regular season, and the Toledo Mercurys won the Turner Cup.

Regular season

Turner Cup-Playoffs

External links
 Season 1950/51 on hockeydb.com

IHL
IHL
International Hockey League (1945–2001) seasons